Amata dimorpha is a moth of the subfamily Arctiinae. It was described by Hans Bytinsky-Salz in 1939. It is found in Armenia and Turkey.

References

dimorpha
Insects of Turkey